Daria Yevgenyevna Kurbonmamadova, née Mezhetskaia (born 24 June 1994) is a Russian judoka.

She won a medal at the 2019 World Judo Championships. She competed in the women's 57 kg event at the 2020 Summer Olympics held in Tokyo, Japan.

References

External links
 

1994 births
Living people
Russian female judoka
Sportspeople from Perm, Russia
Judoka at the 2019 European Games
European Games medalists in judo
European Games gold medalists for Russia
Judoka at the 2020 Summer Olympics
Olympic judoka of Russia
21st-century Russian women